The Japanese offensive called 太原作戦  or the Battle of Taiyuan  was a major battle fought in 1937 between China and Japan named for Taiyuan (the capital of Shanxi province), which lay in the 2nd Military Region. The battle concluded in a victory for Japan over the National Revolutionary Army (NRA), including part of Suiyuan, most of Shanxi and the NRA arsenal at Taiyuan, and effectively ended large-scale organized resistance in the North China area.

Japanese forces included the Japanese Northern China Area Army under Hisaichi Terauchi, elements of the Kwantung Army, and elements of the Inner Mongolian Army led by Demchugdongrub. Chinese forces were commanded by Yan Xishan (warlord of Shanxi), Wei Lihuang (14th Army Group), and Fu Zuoyi (7th Army Group), as well as Zhu De who led the Eighth Route Army of the Chinese Communist Party (under the Second United Front alliance).

Occupation of the territories gave the Japanese access to coal from Datong in northern Shanxi, but also exposed them to attacks by the guerrilla forces of the Nationalist army including the Eighth Route Army, tying down many Japanese troops which could have been diverted to other campaigns.

Chronology
In September 1937, Hideki Tojo sent the Japanese army stationed in Chahar to invade Shanxi in order to exploit its resources. The city of Datong fell, and the NRA was forced to go on the defensive, and concentrated their troops along the Great Wall in battles at places like Pingxingguan and to the east at Niangziguan.

On September 21, 1937, Major Hiroshi Miwa, commander of the 1st Daitai, 16th Hiko Rentai of the IJAAF, who was a former-hired military flight instructor for Zhang Xueliang's Fengtian army air corps and well known in the Chinese military aviation circles of the time, led 7 Kawasaki Ki-10 fighters on an escort mission for 14 Mitsubishi Ki-2 bombers to attack the city of Taiyuan, encountered Chinese Air Force V-65C Corsairs and Curtiss Hawk IIs, shooting down several, however Major Miwa himself was shot down and killed over Taiyuan in a duel with Captain Chan Kee-Wong, commander of the 28th PS, 5th PG whilst flying a Curtiss Hawk II.

Yan Xishan also sent troops to reinforce Shijiazhuang, but that caused a lack of personnel to defend the North China area, allowing the Japanese army to break through in the north forcing the Chinese to fall back to a new line at Xinkou. Fighting continued in October in the Battle of Xinkou until the Japanese outflanked Niangziguan in late October, compromising the Chinese defense resulting in the fall of Taiyuan.

See also
Order of battle of the Battle of Taiyuan

Sources
 Hsu Long-hsuen and Chang Ming-kai, History of The Sino-Japanese War (1937-1945) 2nd Ed., 1971. Translated by Wen Ha-hsiung, Chung Wu Publishing; 33, 140th Lane, Tung-hwa Street, Taipei, Taiwan Republic of China.  Pg. 195–200,  Map 6

References

Taiyuan
1937 in China
1937 in Japan
Taiyuan 1937
Taiyuan 1937
Taiyuan, Battle of
Mengjiang
September 1937 events
October 1937 events
November 1937 events